Lacistodes fuscomaculata is a moth of the family Gelechiidae. It was described by Oleksiy V. Bidzilya and Wolfram Mey in 2011. It is found in Namibia.

References

Moths described in 2011
Pexicopiini